Marie Ann Battiste  (born 1949) is an author and educator working as a professor in Canada at the University of Saskatchewan in the Department of Educational Foundations. From the Potlotek First Nation in Nova Scotia, Battiste is the daughter of Mi'kmaq parents John and Annie Battiste and is one of four children. Battiste was raised in Houlton, Maine, where she attended high school graduating in 1967. From there she went on to the University of Maine graduating from the Farmington campus in 1971 with her teaching certificate and a bachelor of science in both elementary and junior high education. She went on to attend Harvard University graduating in 1974 with a master of education in administration and social policy as well as Stanford University, where in 1984 she graduated with a doctor of education in curriculum and teacher education.

Work
After graduating from the University of Maine in 1971 Battiste went on to work at the Maine Indian Education Council where she introduced and developed an early childhood education program, Head Start, on three reservations and in multiple off reservation communities. Battiste spent twenty-five years in Cape Breton where she worked alongside James (Sakej) Youngblood Henderson with young Mi'kmaq students helping them become teacher and lawyers, as well as fighting for their admittance into universities. The work Battiste and Henderson did together grew the number of Mi'kmaq teachers from a few to sixty, and the addition of ten lawyers where there had previously been none. Battiste has worked in the field of Indian education for over thirty years with her most well known work being the revitalization of Mi'kmaq language in her home community in Chapel Island, Nova Scotia. She credits her doctoral dissertation as one of the many starting points interest in revitalizing the native language saying that a conversation with her advisor about the multiple writing systems of the Mi'kmaq language inspired her to research the histories of these writing systems. There are three different methods for writing with two still in use the first and most commonly used is the Pacifique system and the second and more controversial method being the Francis-Smith system. According to Battiste the Francis-Smith system of writing comes with more controversy for many reasons but the primary reason being, as she puts it, "reflecting the fact that we are now using English as a second language in most of our communities," and "it seems to undercut the power of the old language for many." Throughout her many years of work in education Battiste has taught a various schools in Nova Scotia including time spent as the Education Director and Principle on the Chapel Island reserve from 1984 to 1988. Battiste is sometimes called a "guru" of aboriginal education and serves as the academic director of the University of Saskatchewan's aboriginal education research centre. She has also served on a multitude of different boards as well as a delegate to the United Nations' Workshop on Indigenous Peoples and Higher Education.

Awards and honours
Battiste has been honoured multiple times with awards for the work that she has done. The most prominent of these awards, Honorary Officer of the Order of Canada in 2019 and in 2008 she was one of 14 recipients of the National Aboriginal Achievement Award, now the Indspire Awards, for her work in aboriginal education in Canada. Her list of honours also includes the 1985 Woman of the Year award from the Sydney, Nova Scotia Professional and Business Women's Society. In the same year she also received the Alumni Achievement award from the University of Maine Farmington. Battiste is the recipient of two Honorary Doctorates one from St. Mary's University in 1987, and the other an Honorary Doctorate of Humane Letters from the University of Maine, Farmington, in 1997. In 1992 she received the 125th Year Queen's Award for Service to the Community as well as the Nova Scotia Social Studies Curriculum Development Award. In 1993 Battiste was honoured with a White Eagle Feather at the Eskasoni School Pow Wow in Eskasoni, Nova Scotia, and again in 1995 was honoured by the Mi'kmaq Grand Council with an Eagle Feather on Mi'kmaq Treaty Day. Both Battiste and Henderson were recipients of the First Nations Publishing Award and the Saskatchewan Book Award in 2000 for Protecting Indigenous Knowledge, a book they wrote together. In 2013, she was awarded the Canadian Association of University Teachers Distinguished Academic Award.

Books
Reclaiming Indigenous Voice and Vision
Protecting Indigenous Knowledge and Heritage: A Global Challenge
First Nations Education in Canada: The Circle Unfolds

References

External links
 University of Saskatchewan: Marie Battiste
 Mi'kmawa Archives: Marie Battiste 

1946 births
Living people
Canadian educators
Canadian women non-fiction writers
First Nations women writers
Harvard Graduate School of Education alumni
Mi'kmaq people
Academic staff of the University of Saskatchewan
Indspire Awards
University of Maine alumni
Stanford Graduate School of Education alumni
20th-century Canadian non-fiction writers
20th-century Canadian women writers
20th-century First Nations writers
21st-century Canadian non-fiction writers
21st-century Canadian women writers
21st-century First Nations writers
Officers of the Order of Canada
First Nations academics